Stephen Rockwell Sestanovich (born June 8, 1950) is an American government official, academic, and author. He is the Kathryn and Shelby Cullom Davis Professor at the School of International and Public Affairs, Columbia University where he is the Director of the International Fellows Program. His areas of expertise include Russia and the former Soviet Union, the Caucasus and Central Asia, and U.S. foreign policy.

Early life and education
Sestanovich was born in 1950.  He has a brother, Ben, and had a sister, Mary (1952–2000).  Their father, Stipe "Steve" Sestanovich (1912–2014), was a journalist and Foreign Service officer born in Lumbarda on the island of Korčula, Austro-Hungarian Empire (now Croatia) to parents Cvita (née Lipanović) and  Roko Šestanović.  Roko left Korčula right before the start of World War I, and only in 1920 did the family reunite in the United States. Their mother, Molly Brown Sestanovich (1921–2014), was a journalist.

Sestanovich holds a B.A. from Cornell University (1972) and a Ph.D. in government from Harvard University (1978).

Career
Sestanovich has held several government positions since 1980, including senior legislative assistant to U.S. Senator Daniel Patrick Moynihan (1980–81), policy planner for the U.S. Department of State during the Reagan Administration (1981–84), and senior director for policy development at the U.S. National Security Council (1984–87). He served as ambassador-at-large and special adviser to the secretary of state for the new independent states of the former Soviet Union under U.S. Secretary of State Madeleine Albright (1997–2001).

In addition to his teaching duties, Sestanovich is the George F. Kennan Senior Fellow for Russian and Eurasian Studies at the Council on Foreign Relations.

Personal life
Sestanovich married Ann Hulbert in 1982. They have a son, Ben, who played baseball at Harvard and now serves as an Assistant General Manager for the Atlanta Braves, and a daughter, Clare, a novelist and short-story writer.

Works
 Maximalist: America in the World from Truman to Obama, New York, 2014,

References

External links

Living people
1950 births
Columbia University faculty
Columbia School of International and Public Affairs faculty
Harvard University alumni
Cornell University alumni
American international relations scholars
American people of Croatian descent
United States Ambassadors-at-Large